Federico Marcelo Anselmo (born 17 April 1994) is an Argentine footballer.

References

Argentine footballers
Argentine expatriate footballers
1994 births
Living people
Estudiantes de La Plata footballers
Atlético de Rafaela footballers
Unión de Santa Fe footballers
Argentinos Juniors footballers
Quilmes Atlético Club footballers
Independiente Santa Fe footballers
Argentine Primera División players
Primera Nacional players
Categoría Primera A players
Association football forwards
Argentine expatriate sportspeople in Colombia
Expatriate footballers in Colombia